Pok is a settlement in Sarawak, Malaysia. Neighbouring settlements include:
 Bengang 0 kilometres (0.0 mi) south

References

Populated places in Sarawak